Oldham Metropolitan Borough Council elections are generally held three years out of every four, with a third of the council being elected each time. Oldham Metropolitan Borough Council, generally known as Oldham Council, is the local authority for the metropolitan borough of Oldham in Greater Manchester, England. Since the last boundary changes in 2004, 60 councillors have been elected from 20 wards. New ward boundaries are due to come into effect from the 2023 election.

Political control
From 1889 to 1974 Oldham was a county borough, independent of any county council. Under the Local Government Act 1972 it had its territory enlarged and became a metropolitan borough, with Greater Manchester County Council providing county-level services. The first election to the reconstituted borough council was held in 1973, initially operating as a shadow authority before coming into its revised powers on 1 April 1974. Greater Manchester County Council was abolished in 1986 and Oldham became a unitary authority. Political control of the council since 1973 has been held by the following parties:

Leadership
The leaders of the council since 1974 have been:

Council elections
1998 Oldham Metropolitan Borough Council election
1999 Oldham Metropolitan Borough Council election
2000 Oldham Metropolitan Borough Council election
2002 Oldham Metropolitan Borough Council election
2003 Oldham Metropolitan Borough Council election
2004 Oldham Metropolitan Borough Council election (whole Metropolitan Borough Council elected after boundary changes)
2006 Oldham Metropolitan Borough Council election
2007 Oldham Metropolitan Borough Council election
2008 Oldham Metropolitan Borough Council election
2010 Oldham Metropolitan Borough Council election
2011 Oldham Metropolitan Borough Council election
2012 Oldham Metropolitan Borough Council election
2014 Oldham Metropolitan Borough Council election
2015 Oldham Metropolitan Borough Council election
2016 Oldham Metropolitan Borough Council election
2018 Oldham Metropolitan Borough Council election
2019 Oldham Metropolitan Borough Council election
2021 Oldham Metropolitan Borough Council election

Changes between elections

Pre-2004 boundaries

2004 boundaries

References

By-election results

External links
Oldham Council

 
Local government in the Metropolitan Borough of Oldham
Elections in the Metropolitan Borough of Oldham
Council elections in Greater Manchester
Metropolitan borough council elections in England